Phyllonorycter obsoleta is a moth of the family Gracillariidae. It is known from Massachusetts, United States.

The wingspan is about 8 mm.

References

obsoleta
Moths of North America
Moths described in 1873